Żydy may refer to:

Żydy, Masovian Voivodeship, Poland
Żydy, Warmian-Masurian Voivodeship, Poland